The Javanese presence in Australia has been reported by native Southeast Asian and European people over several centuries. The most renowned record is from the itinerary of Chiaymasiouro, king of Demak, and Declaraçam de Malaca e India Meridional com o Cathay by Manuel Godinho de Eredia. Chiaymasiouro describes a land called Luca Antara in Southeast direction of Java, which Eredia coined the term India Meridional (Meridional India - Southern/South India). According to Chiaymasiouro's accounts (1601 AD), a subgroup of Javanese people already settled in those lands, but when Eredia's servant went to Luca Antara in 1610, the land had seemingly been abandoned.

History

Pre-1500 

Reference to Australia and native Australian people has been recorded in 10th century AD Java. According to Waharu IV inscription (931 AD) and Garaman inscription (1053 AD), the Mataram Kingdom and Airlangga's era Kahuripan Kingdom (1000–1049 AD) of Java experienced a long prosperity so that it needed a lot of manpower, especially to bring crops, packings, and send them to ports. Black labor was imported from Jenggi (Zanzibar), Pujut (Sarawak), and Bondan (Papua). According to Naerssen, they arrived in Java by trading (bought by merchants) or being taken prisoner during a war and then made slaves.

1500–1600 

Ludovico di Varthema (1470–1517), in his book Itinerario de Ludouico de Varthema Bolognese, stated that the Southern Javanese people sailed to "far Southern lands" up to the point they arrived at an island where a day only lasted four hours long and was "colder than in any part of the world". Modern studies have determined that such an island would have been located at least 900 nautical miles (1666 km) south of the southernmost point of Tasmania.

Around the second quarter of 16th century, several European maps included a continent called Jave la Grande (or La Grande Jave). In La Cosmographie, Alfonse defined La Grande Jave as an extension of the giant Antarctic continent, or Terra Australis: "This Java touches the Strait of Magellan in the west, and in the east Terra Australis ... I estimate that the coast of the Ocean Sea called the Austral coast extends eastwards to Java, to the western coast of the said Java". Apparently in deference to Marco Polo's claim that Java Major was the largest island in the world, Alfonse gave the name Jave Mynore to the island of Java and the name La Grand Jave to the continental land to the south. Marco Polo's Java Minor, he called Samatrez (Sumatra). In La Cosmographie (1544), Alfonse said:La Grand Jave is a land that goes as far as under the Antarctic Pole and from the Terre Australle in the west to the land of the Strait of Magellan on the eastern side. Some say that it is islands but from what I have seen of it, it is terre ferme [a continent] ... That called Jave Mynore is an island, but la Grand Jave is terre ferme.

Post-1600

Luca Antara 
Declaraçam de Malaca e India Meridional com o Cathay by Manuel Godinho de Eredia (1613), described what he called "Meridional India". In his book he relates about the voyage of Chiaymasiouro (or Chiay Masiuro), king of Damuth (Demak) in Java, to a Southern land called Luca Antara (or Lucaantara). A brief description of this country is given in a letter written by Chiaymasiouro to the King of Pahang and in a certificate made by Pedro de Carvalhaes at Malacca on 4 October 1601.

In part 1 "Concerning the Meridional India" Eredia mentioned that the Meridional India consist of the mainland called Lucach, which has a peninsula named Beach, and a country called Lucaantara (or Luca Antara). In the east of Lucaantara is two small island Agania and Necuran, and a larger island called Java Minor. To the west is Angaman Minor or Luca Tambini (island of women), and Angaman Major or Lucapiatto. The lontares (lontar leaf texts) and annals of Java mention Meridional India and its commerce and trade.

In Report of Meridional India (1610) Eredia mentioned that in ancient times merchants carried on extensive intercourse and trade from Luca Antara with Java. This trade and commerce was destroyed for a period of 331 years; it ceased on account of wars and conflicts between the states. They were not able to communicate with each other until the year 1600 (this would mean that the communication was stopped in 1269). In that year, a boat from Lucaantara carried out of its course by a storm and landed in the port of Balambuam (Blambangan) in Java, where the occupants were well-received.

The strangers from Lucaantara resembled the Javanese of Banten; but speak different language, which made Eredia believe that they were another type of Javanese. This incident excited Chiaymasiouro, which consequently embarked on a kelulus from Blambangan which has been equipped with oar and sail, to the south. After 12 days, he arrived at the port of Lucaantara, a peninsula or island 600 Spanish leagues in circumference. There he was received by the syahbandar (the king of the land was upriver in the interior, 8 days away), and stayed for several days.

According to the itinerary of Chiaymasiouro, Lucaantara should be the general name for the peninsula, which has a distance of about 140 Spanish leagues from Blambangan. The account of Chiaymasiouro is as follows:Having equipped myself for travel and supplied myself with necessary requirements, I embarked with some companions in a kelulus or vessel provided with oars, and set out from the port of Blambangan towards the south. After a voyage lasting 12 days, I reached the port of Lucaantara; there I disembarked and was received by the syahbandar with demonstrations of pleasure. Being fatigued with the voyage, I was unable to see the King of Lucaantara, who was staying up-river in the Hinterland, eight days’ journey away.

The King was advised of my arrival and presented me with some handfulls of gold coins resembling in appearance the gold “Venetian” of Venice. I was hospitably entertained as long as I remained in the country, and enjoyed the splendid freshness of the climate. I saw a considerable amount of gold, cloves, mace, white sandalwood, and other spices, as well as large quantities of foodstuffs of every kind which are produced in this country.

The island of Lucaantara is as large as Java, in which Blambangan is situated. The people are Javanese, as in our own Java, though their language is somewhat different. They wear their hair hanging as far as the shoulder, while the head is girt with a fillet of hammered gold. The keris is ornamented with precious stones, like the keris with the curved scabbard in Bali.

Speaking generally, the Javanese people of Lucaantara spend their whole time in sports and pastimes: they are especially addicted to cock-fighting. When it was time to start on our voyage, I requested the syahbandar to inform the King that the monsoon was now favourable for my return to my own country. Provided with a stock of necessaries, I set out from Lucaantara, and after a few days’ voyage arrived at the port of Blambangan, to the great astonishment of the whole of Java.

— Letter of Chiaymasiouro, the king of Damuth, to the king of Pahang

Soon after his arrival in 1601, he met an Alderman of Malacca, Pedro de Carvalhaes, who attested his arrival and his voyage:I, Pedro de Carvalhaes, citizen and alderman of Malaca, certify that I met Chiaymasiouro, King of Damuth, at Surabaya, where in the course of conversation he related how “a rowing-boat from Lucaantara, driven out of its course by currents and ill winds or storms, reached the port of Blambangan": Actuated by curiosity, I gave orders for a calelus or boat provided with oars to be equipped with an adequate supply of all necessaries, and I set out with some companions from the port of Blambangan towards the south: After a voyage of 12 days, I reached the port of Lucaantara, where I was well received and entertained by the inhabitants, who are Javanese like those of Java Major (the true Java), similar in build and colour, and for the most part having similar interests, though their language is different. The island of Lucaantara has a compass of more than 600 leagues in circumference. I saw a considerable amount of gold, cloves, mace, white sandal-wood, and other spices, as well as large quantities of foodstuffs of every kind which are produced in this country. The earth is very fertile and the trees keep the climate cool. The country is organized into several kingdoms: And contains many populous towns and villages.” The whole of the above account was given to me by Chiaymasiouro and his companions. This matter of Lucaantara was a subject of public notoriety in Surabaya and in other parts of Java Major. Since I have been asked for this information by the Descobridor Manuel Godinho de Eredia, in the interests of his voyage and for the advantage of the King’s service, I swear by the Holy Gospels that this is the truth, and that it is my signature which appears below. At Malacca, on the 4th day of October in the year 1601.

— Pedro de Carvalhaes

After hearing his account, Eredia instructed one of his servants to travel to Java. In the bay of fishermen (in Southern coast of Java) this servant joined the fishermen there and crossed for 6 days to the coast of Luca Antara. He disembarked on a deserted coast, and did not observe any people. The servant remained there 3 days and confirmed the truth of Chiay Masiuro's account regarding the quantity of gold, and all kinds of metals and minerals, and precious stones, cloves, nutmegs, mace, and sandalwoods, and other riches. After 3 days he returned to the bay of the fishermen, and then gave information about his voyage in the year 1610. In Report of Meridional India (1610) Eredia mentioned that the Javanese people of Luca Antara in all of their customs and in figure resemble the Javanese of Sunda (West Java), only a slight difference in the language, which he described as "much the same as between the Castillian and the Portuguese". The hair extends as far as the shoulders, the tonsure resembles the tonsure of Balinese people, with a curiously curved contour.

Objections 
The statement of Lucaantara being Australia is objected by Richard Henry Major, in Archaeologia (1873). p. 243 et sqq. His objections is responded by J. V. Mills in Eredia's Description of Malaca, Meridional India, and Cathay (1930). pp. 188–190. The arguments is as follow:

Notes

See also 

 Makassan contact with Australia
 Trepanging, the act of collecting sea cucumber
 Patorani and padewakang, two types of perahu used for trepanging by Makassan
 Yolngu
 Theory of Portuguese discovery of Australia
 Baijini, a race of mythical or historical people mentioned in the Djanggawul song cycle of the Yolngu people of Arnhem Land.
 Marchinbar Island, location of a deposit of early coins in Australia
 Jave la Grande, according to Marco Polo, the largest island in the world.

References

Further reading 

 
 De Eredia, Manuel Godinho (1613). Description of Malacca and Meridional India. Translated from the Portuguese with notes by J. V. Mills in Eredia's Description of Malaca, Meridional India, and Cathay, Journal of the Malayan Branch of the Royal Asiatic Society. Vol. VIII, April 1930.
 Jones, John Winter (1863). The travels of Ludovico di Varthema in Egypt, Syria, Arabia Deserta and Arabia Felix, in Persia, India, and Ethiopia, A.D. 1503 to 1508. Hakluyt Society.
 
 Nugroho, Irawan Djoko (2011). Majapahit Peradaban Maritim. Suluh Nuswantara Bakti. .
 Triastanti, Ani. Perdagangan Internasional pada Masa Jawa Kuno; Tinjauan Terhadap Data Tertulis Abad X-XII. Essay of Faculty of Cultural Studies. Gadjah Mada University of Yogyakarta, 2007.

Australia–Indonesia relations
History of Australia before 1788
History of Indigenous Australians
History of Indonesia
History of Java
Maritime history of Australia
Yolngu
Pre-1606 contact with Australia
Islam in Australia